Georgios Portelanos (born 29 August 1966) is a Greek former cyclist. He competed in two events at the 1992 Summer Olympics.

References

External links
 

1966 births
Living people
Greek male cyclists
Olympic cyclists of Greece
Cyclists at the 1992 Summer Olympics
Sportspeople from Athens
20th-century Greek people